KOKO (1450 AM, "Good Time Oldies 1450") is an American radio station licensed to serve the community of Warrensburg, the county seat of Johnson County, Missouri.  The station's broadcast license is held by D&H Media LLC.

KOKO broadcasts a full service oldies music format branded "Good Time Oldies 1450". In addition to music, KOKO broadcasts national, regional, and local news, plus local sports and weather information.

The station was assigned the call sign "KOKO" by the Federal Communications Commission (FCC). It signed on in December 1953.

References

External links
KOKO official website

OKO
Oldies radio stations in the United States
Full service radio stations in the United States
Radio stations established in 1953
1953 establishments in Missouri
Johnson County, Missouri